Prestwich Camera was a cine camera eventually fitted with external magazines capable of holding up  of film.

Several types of "Prestwich Camera" were manufactured in the late 19th century.  One of the earliest designs of this type held  of film—more film than any other camera of the age.

According to Carl Louis Gregory,

An advertisement in Hopwood's "Living Pictures" edition of 1899 offers the "Prestwich" specialties for animated photography -- "nine different models of cameras and projectors in three sizes for l/2-inch, 1 3/8-inch and 2 3/8-inch width of film."

See also
History of cinema

References
Coe, Brian. The History of Movie Photography; Eastview Editions, 1981
Gregory, Carl Louis.  "The Early History of Wide Films: Being a Peek into the Past that is Both Interesting and Enlightening" published in American Cinematographer (January, 1930)
Toulmin, Vanessa et al. (eds.), The Lost World of Mitchell and Kenyon: Edwardian Britain on Film, London, British Film Institute (2004).

Movie cameras